Thomas Ellis (1569–1627) was the member of Parliament for Great Grimsby in 1597.

References 

1569 births
1627 deaths
English MPs 1597–1598
Members of the Parliament of England for Great Grimsby